In topology, the Sorgenfrey plane is a frequently-cited counterexample to many otherwise plausible-sounding conjectures.  It consists of the product of two copies of the Sorgenfrey line, which is the real line  under the half-open interval topology. The Sorgenfrey line and plane are named for the American mathematician Robert Sorgenfrey.

A basis for the Sorgenfrey plane, denoted  from now on, is therefore the set of rectangles that include the west edge, southwest corner, and south edge, and omit the southeast corner, east edge, northeast corner, north edge, and northwest corner.

 is an example of a space that is a product of Lindelöf spaces that is not itself a Lindelöf space. The so-called anti-diagonal  is an uncountable discrete subset of this space, and this is a non-separable subset of the separable space . It shows that separability does not inherit to closed subspaces. Thus it serves as a counterexample to the notion that the product of normal spaces is normal; in fact, it shows that even the finite product of perfectly normal spaces need not be normal.

See also 

 List of topologies
 Moore plane

References 
   Reprinted as 
 Robert Sorgenfrey, "On the topological product of paracompact spaces", Bull. Amer. Math. Soc. 53 (1947) 631–632.
 

Topological spaces